Giuseppe Antonio Brunelli (1922-2016) was a contemporary Italian poet, essayist and translator residing in Florence, Italy, where he concluded his tenure at the University of Florence, teaching French Language and Literature from 1946 to 1994. He was born in Milan, Italy, and prior to moving to Florence lived in Catania (Sicily) and Messina.

His works focused on philology as well as historical and literary criticism. His research encompassed publications ranging from the fifteenth to the twentieth century French literature, and he published volumes of his poems and translations in verse.

Published works

References

Italian poets
Italian male poets
Writers from Florence
1922 births
2016 deaths
20th-century Italian translators
20th-century Italian male writers